Grace Spicer (born 19 September 1992) is an English kickboxer and Nak Muay. She is the IKF World Flyweight champion, is the  WBC Muaythai International and British Super Flyweight champion, and has challenged for the WBC Muaythai World Super Flyweight title.

As of April 2020, she is the #1 ranked Super Flyweight according to WBC Muaythai, as well as being the mandatory challenger.

Martial arts career
Spicer won the WBC Muaythai International Super Flyweight title with a unanimous decision win over Ariana Santos.

In August of 2019 Spicer fought Cindy Silvestre, and won the fight, as well as the IKF World Flyweight title, by a unanimous decision.

In 2020, Spicer fought Lara Fernandez for the WBC Muaythai World Super Flyweight title. Spicer lost a unanimous decision.

Championships and accomplishments
International Kickboxing Federation
IKF World Flyweight Championship
World Boxing Council Muaythai
WBC Muaythai International Super Flyweight Championship
WBC Muaythai British Super Flyweight Championship

Kickboxing record

|-  bgcolor=
|-  bgcolor="#FFBBBB"
| 9 Mar 2020|| Loss||align=left| Lara Fernandez || Combat Fight Series 4 || London, England || Decision (Unanimous) || 5 || 2:00|| 11-4
|-
! style=background:white colspan=9 |
|-
|-  bgcolor="#CCFFCC"
| 3 Aug 2019|| Win||align=left| Cindy Silvestre || Capital Punishment || Southampton, England || Decision (Unanimous) || 5 || 2:00|| 11-3
|-
! style=background:white colspan=9 |
|-
|-  bgcolor="#CCFFCC"
| 10 Nov 2018|| Win||align=left| Martina Bernille || Muay Thai Grand Prix 21 || London, England || Decision (Unanimous) || 3 || 3:00|| 10-3
|-
|-  bgcolor="#FFBBBB"
| 7 Apr 2015|| Loss||align=left| Nicola Kaye || MTGP PRESENTS LF41 || London, England || Decision (Unanimous) || 5 || 2:00|| 9-3
|-
|-  bgcolor="#FFBBBB"
| 7 Apr 2015|| Loss||align=left| Marina Zueva || Dinamite Fight Night 28 || Lisbon, Portugal || Decision (Unanimous) || 3 || 3:00|| 9-2
|-
! style=background:white colspan=9 |
|-
|-  bgcolor="#CCFFCC"
| 6 Dec 2014|| Win||align=left| Mellony Geugjes || ? || Amsterdam, Netherlands || Decision (Unanimous) || 3 || 3:00|| 9-1
|-
|-  bgcolor="#CCFFCC"
| 8 Nov 2014|| Win||align=left| Ariana Santos || Muaythai Mayhem || London, England || Decision (Unanimous) || 5 || 2:00|| 8-1
|-
! style=background:white colspan=9 |
|-
|-  bgcolor="#CCFFCC"
| 4 May 2014|| Win||align=left| Leonie Hardman || Muaythai Mayhem || London, England || Decision (Unanimous) || 5 || 2:00|| 7-1
|-
! style=background:white colspan=9 |
|-
|-  bgcolor="#CCFFCC"
| 16 Mar 2014|| Win||align=left| Sarah Chaz || Super MTC || London, England || Decision (Unanimous) || 3 || 2:00|| 6-1
|-
|-  bgcolor="#FFBBBB"
| 2 Nov 2013|| Loss||align=left| Christi Brereton || Super MTC || London, England || Decision (Unanimous) || 5 || 2:00|| 5-1
|-
! style=background:white colspan=9 |
|-
|-  bgcolor="#CCFFCC"
| 17 Aug 2013|| Win||align=left| Anne Line Hogstad || Stand and Bang || London, England || Decision (Unanimous) || 5 || 2:00|| 5-0
|-
| colspan=9 | Legend:

See also
List of female kickboxers

References 

1992 births
Living people
Sportspeople from London
English Muay Thai practitioners
Female Muay Thai practitioners
English female kickboxers